There are four prominent waterfalls in the basin of a short tributary of Sulphide Creek, on the southeast flank of 9,127-foot (2,781m) Mount Shuksan in North Cascades National Park, Washington. Seahpo Peak Falls and Cloudcap Falls, the taller two of the three, are located on separate streams that converge and plunge over Rockflow Canyon Falls. The unnamed outlet stream from these waterfalls flows into Sulphide Creek, which flows into the Baker River. Another waterfall is Jagged Ridge Falls, on a tributary of the unnamed stream.

Seahpo Peak Falls

The largest (but not tallest) of the waterfalls on Mount Shuksan, it stands about 2,200 feet (670m) high and has 6 distinct tiers, the largest of which drops about 500 sheer feet (152m) .

It is located near the five waterfalls of Sulphide Basin.

Its name stems from a Chinook Jargon word meaning "cap".

Cloudcap Falls

Although it is slightly taller than Seahpo Peak Falls, it is more seasonal and has a smaller volume, and is essentially a long cascade that does not have any prominent vertical drops.

Rockflow Canyon Falls

It is the final waterfall on the drainage before it empties into the Baker River. In some months it is seen in tandem with a seasonal waterfall of similar height.

Jagged Ridge Falls

See also
List of waterfalls by height
Sulphide Creek Falls

Notes

Waterfalls of Washington (state)
North Cascades of Washington (state)
Waterfalls of Whatcom County, Washington
North Cascades National Park